The 2006 NCAA Division I baseball season, play of college baseball in the United States organized by the National Collegiate Athletic Association (NCAA) at the Division I level, began on January 26, 2006.  The season progressed through the regular season, many conference tournaments and championship series, and concluded with the 2006 NCAA Division I baseball tournament and 2006 College World Series.  The College World Series, which consisted of the eight remaining teams in the NCAA tournament, was held in its annual location of Omaha, Nebraska, at Rosenblatt Stadium.  It concluded on June 26, 2006, with the final game of the best of three championship series.  Oregon State defeated North Carolina two games to one to claim their first championship.

Realignment

New programs
Stephen F. Austin brought back its varsity intercollegiate baseball program for the 2006 season, after having dropped the program following the 1995 season.

Both Kennesaw State and North Florida transitioned from Division II to Division I for the 2006 season.

Conference changes

Entering the 2006 baseball season, many baseball-sponsoring schools changed conferences.  Several schools left Conference USA, as Charlotte and St. Louis left for the Atlantic 10 Conference, Cincinnati, Louisville, and South Florida left for the Big East Conference, and Texas Christian left for the Mountain West Conference.  In order to replace these schools, Conference USA added Rice from the Western Athletic Conference, Marshall from the Mid-American Conference, and Central Florida from the Atlantic Sun Conference.

In order to compensate for the schools lost to Conference USA, the Western Athletic Conference also made several changes.  New Mexico State joined from the Sun Belt Conference, along with Sacramento State, previously a Division I Independent.  The Sun Belt, in turn, added Florida Atlantic and Troy from the Atlantic Sun.  The Colonial Athletic Association added Northeastern from the America East Conference and Georgia State from the Atlantic Sun Conference.

The Atlantic Sun added three schools, East Tennessee State from the Southern Conference and Kennesaw State and North Florida from the Division II Peach Belt Conference.

The Atlantic Coast Conference added Boston College from the Big East.

The Southland Conference added one program, as conference member Stephen F. Austin revived its baseball program.

Conference formats
As a result of the addition of Boston College as a 12th member, the Atlantic Coast Conference split into two six-team divisions.  The Atlantic 10 Conference, which had added both Charlotte and St. Louis, eliminated its previous format of two six-team divisions.  The West Coast Conference, which had previously competed in two four-team divisions, also eliminated its divisional format.

Conference standings

College World Series

The 2006 season marked the sixtieth NCAA Baseball Tournament, which culminated with the eight team College World Series.  The College World Series was held in Omaha, Nebraska.  The eight teams played a double-elimination format, with Oregon State claiming their first championship with a two games to one series win over North Carolina in the final.

Bracket

Award winners

All-America team

References 

2006 Division I Standings at BoydsWorld.com